Derbyshire County Cricket Club in 1947 represents the  cricket season when the English club Derbyshire had been playing for seventy-six years. It was their forty-third  season in the County Championship and they won twelve matches and lost ten to  finish fifth in the County Championship.

1947 season

Derbyshire played 26 matches in the County Championship and two against touring sides from Ireland and South Africa. They won eleven matches in the Championship and won the game against Ireland.

Edward Gothard was brought into the side as captain in 1947 and the club saw a marked improvement in rating.  Charlie Elliott was top scorer and Cliff Gladwin and George Pope equalled on wickets taken in the County Championship at 102, but Gladwin took most overall with 117. Derbyshire struggled with the wicket-keeping. Denis Smith was wicket-keeper for much of the season, but Harry Elliott was brought back for a four match spell before George Dawkes joined for the last few matches of the season. Charlie Elliott and Alderman also took spells behind the stumps.

Apart from Gothard, debuting as captain three important players to join the club were  HL Jackson, George Dawkes and David Skinner. Jackson had a long career and was one of the club's leading bowlers. Dawkes came in as wicket-keeper for the last four matches of the season and remained as Derbyshire's wicket-keeper for many seasons. Skinner had a shorter career but was captain after Gothard. DC Brooke-Taylor also joined the side as stand-in captain in his first game and played for three seasons. Richard Watson played just 6 matches for Derbyshire which were all in the 1947 season.

Matches

Statistics

County Championship batting averages

County Championship bowling averages

Wicket Keepers
Denis Smith Catches 30, Stumping 0 
CS Elliott  Catches 22, Stumping 1 
H Elliott Catches 7, Stumping 1 
GO Dawkes Catches 3, Stumping 0

See also
Derbyshire County Cricket Club seasons
1947 English cricket season

References

1947 in English cricket
Derbyshire County Cricket Club seasons